Dean Booth, born in 1977, is a paralympic swimmer from New Zealand competing mainly in category S7 events.

Biography

Booth attended Lynfield College in Auckland.

Booth was part of the New Zealand Paralympic swim team that made the short trip to Sydney for the 2000 Summer Paralympics. There he broke the world record and won the 400 m freestyle race narrowly beating Great Britain's David Roberts. Roberts got revenge in the 100 m freestyle where he won in a new games record while Booth finished third and 50 m freestyle where he broke the world record and Booth finished fourth.

References

External links 
 
 

Year of birth missing (living people)
Living people
New Zealand male freestyle swimmers
Paralympic swimmers of New Zealand
Paralympic gold medalists for New Zealand
Paralympic bronze medalists for New Zealand
Swimmers at the 2000 Summer Paralympics
Medalists at the 2000 Summer Paralympics
Paralympic medalists in swimming
S7-classified Paralympic swimmers
People educated at Lynfield College